This is a list of Native American musicians and singers. They are notable musicians and singers, who are from Peoples indigenous to the contemporary United States, including Alaska Natives, Native Hawaiians, and Native Americans in the United States. While Native American identity can at times be a complex and contested issue, the Bureau of Indian Affairs defines Native American as having American Indian or Alaska Native ancestry, and legally, being Native American is defined as being enrolled in a federally recognized tribe or Alaskan village. Ethnologically, factors such as culture, history, language, religion, and familial kinships can influence Native American identity.

All individuals on this list should have Native American ancestry, not just personal claims/belief. Historical figures might predate tribal enrollment practices and would be included based on ethnological tribal membership, while any contemporary individuals should either be enrolled members of federally recognized tribes or have cited Native American ancestry and be recognized as being Native American by their respective tribes(s). Contemporary unenrolled individuals are listed as being of descent from a tribe.

For Indigenous musicians in and from Canada, see List of Indigenous musicians in Canada.

Classical
Steven Alvarez (composer, percussionist, film & stage producer)(Yaqui/Mescalero Apache/Upper Tanana Athabascan)
Timothy Archambault (composer and flutist)(Kichesipirini Algonquin First Nation)
Dawn Avery (Mohawk), composer, cellist, vocalist, educator
Louis W. Ballard (Quapaw/Cherokee), "known as the father of Native American composition
Raven Chacon (Navajo), composer and visual artist
Atalie Unkalunt (Cherokee, 1895-1954), opera and Indianist singer

Country and folk
 Joanne Shenandoah (Oneida Indian Nation, 1957–2021)
 Buddy Red Bow (Lakota)

Gospel
 Johnny P. Curtis (San Carlos Apache)
 Klaudt Indian Family (Lillian White Corn Little Soldier, Arikara-Mandan)

Jazz
 Mildred Bailey (jazz singer)  (Coeur d'Alene)
 Jim Pepper (Muscogee/Kaw)
 Big Chief Russell Moore (Pima, 1912–1983)

Native American flute

 Robert Tree Cody (Hunkpapa/Maricopa) 
 Brent Michael Davids, (Stockbridge Mohican) composer and flutist
 Joseph FireCrow (Northern Cheyenne)
 Hawk Littlejohn (Eastern Band Cherokee)
 Charles Littleleaf (Warm Springs/Blackfoot)
 Kevin Locke (Lakota)
 Tom Mauchahty-Ware (Kiowa/Comanche)
 Bill Miller (Mahican)
 Robert Mirabal (Taos Pueblo)
 R. Carlos Nakai (Navajo/Ute)
 Sonny Nevaquaya (Comanche)
 Jay Red Eagle (Cherokee Nation)
 Andrew Vasquez (Kiowa Apache)
 Tommy Wildcat (Cherokee Nation/Muscogee/Natchez)
 Mary Youngblood (Aleut/Seminole)

Native American protest singers
 Floyd Red Crow Westerman (Sisseton Wahpeton Oyate)
 John Trudell (Santee Dakota)

New age and world music
 Brulé (Sioux)
 Joanne Shenandoah (Oneida Indian Nation, 1957–2021)
 Verdell Primeaux and Johnny Mike (Oglala/Yankton/Ponca/Navajo)
 Michael Hedges (Cherokee, 1953-1997)

Pop and rock
 Chuck Billy of Testament (Pomo)
 Jimmy Carl Black (Southern Cheyenne descent)
 Blackfire (Navajo)
 Blackfoot 
 Jim Boyd (Colville)
 Jesse Ed Davis (Comanche/Kiowa/Muscogee/Seminole)
 Willy DeVille (Pequot)
 Champion Jack Dupree (self-identified Cherokee descent) 
 Gary Duncan of Quicksilver Messenger Service (Skidi Pawnee)
 Nokie Edwards (Cherokee)
 Joy Harjo and Poetic Justice (Mvskoke)
 Indigenous (Nakota)
 Debora Iyall of Romeo Void (Cowlitz) 
 Jana (Lumbee)
 Grant-Lee Phillips (Muscogee (Creek)), Red Earth
 Redbone, members are mostly Yaqui/Shoshone descent
 Keith Secola (Bois Forte Chippewa)
 John Trudell (Santee Dakota)
 XIT, members are Colville, Isleta Pueblo, Diné, and Muscogee Creek
 Spencer Battiest (Seminole/Choctaw)
 Sky Ferreira (Chippewa Cree)
 Samantha Crain (Choctaw Nation)
 Black Belt Eagle Scout (Swinomish/Iñupiaq)

Rap and hip hop
 Julian B. (Muscogee)
 Lil Mike and Funny Bone (both Pawnee/Choctaw)
 Litefoot (Cherokee Nation/Chichimeca)
 Supaman (Apsáalooke)
 Frank Waln (Sicangu Lakota)

Powwow music
 Black Lodge Singers (Piegan Blackfeet)
 Cozad Singers (Kiowa)

See also
 Native American composers

References

Native Americans
 
Musicians
Native American